Gus is an unincorporated community in Muhlenberg County, in the U.S. state of Kentucky.

History
A post office called Gus was established in 1907, and remained in operation until 1955. Gustie Wagoner, the first postmaster, gave the community its name.

References

Unincorporated communities in Muhlenberg County, Kentucky
Unincorporated communities in Kentucky